Bulgarian-Estonian relations are foreign relations between Bulgaria and Estonia. Bulgaria recognised Estonia on May 20, 1922 and re-recognised Estonia on August 26, 1991.  Both countries restored diplomatic relations on September 10, 1991.
Both countries are members of the European Union and NATO.

Diplomatic missions
Bulgaria is represented in Estonia through an honorary consulate in Tallinn. Estonia has an embassy and an honorary consulate in Sofia.

See also 
 Foreign relations of Bulgaria
 Foreign relations of Estonia

External links
  Estonian Ministry of Foreign Affairs about relations with Bulgaria

 

 
Estonia
Bilateral relations of Estonia